The Mini John Cooper Works Rally is an off-road competition car based on the Mini Countryman, which is built and used by the German racing team X-Raid around team manager Sven Quandt. The John Cooper Works Rally was first used in the 2017 Dakar Rally.

Competition history
In its first outing, the 2017 Dakar Rally, the X-raid MINI John Cooper Works Rally Team started with the following driver pairings:

Mikko Hirvonen/Michel Perin - red MINI John Cooper Works Rally
Yazeed Al-Rajhi/Timo Gottschalk - green MINI John Cooper Works Rally
Orlando Terranova/Andreas Schulz - silver MINI John Cooper Works Rally

In 2018, Al-Rajhi and Gottschalk won the Silk Way Rally in the passenger car class with a John Cooper Works Rally.

See also
Mini
Mini All4 Racing
Mini Countryman
Mini John Cooper Works WRC
Mini All4 Racing
X-raid

References

External links
 X-raid website

Rally cars
Rally raid cars
Mini (BMW) vehicles